Bumble bee snail may refer to:

Engina trifasciata
Engina mendicaria

Animal common name disambiguation pages